Nancy Criss is an American producer, awards director and actress. She host and produces the entertainment news magazine show On the Road Weekly on ION television.

By the age of 13, Criss began her career in show business, with a role in the TV series Petrocelli, followed by several independent projects. She has appeared in TV, feature films, commercials and stage plays. She currently lives in Tucson, Arizona.

Nancy Criss is President and co-founder of Nandar Entertainment Inc.

Criss was born in Elkhart, Indiana.

Filmography

See also
 List of female film and television directors
 List of LGBT-related films directed by women

References 
 Old Tucson Studios "Old Tucson Studios is home to ON THE ROAD WEEKLY", Press Release. Retrieved February 9, 2009
 Gerald M. Gay 2009, Arizona Daily Star "New life for Old Tucson" Tucson, Arizona. Retrieved February 1, 2009

External links 
Official Website to Nancy Criss

Nancy Criss at Nandar Entertainment
Join Nancy Criss on FaceBook
Nancy Criss - Host/Producer of ON THE ROAD WEEKLY

Living people
Actresses from Tucson, Arizona
21st-century American actresses
American television actresses
American women television producers
American film actresses
Year of birth missing (living people)
People from Elkhart, Indiana
Film directors from Indiana
Television producers from Indiana